The European qualification for the 2015 FIVB Women's Junior World Championship, in Puerto Rico will be played over two rounds.

In the first round of qualification, 20 teams are split into five groups. The group winners and the best second place team will qualify for the second round and join the champion and the vice-champion of the 2014 Women's Junior European Volleyball Championship already secured in the second round.

Qualification phase 1

Pools
The pools were confirmed by CEV on October 7, 2014.

Pool A
Venue:  Centro Pavesi, Milan, Italy
All times are Central European Time (UTC+01:00).

|}

|}

Pool B
Venue:  Audentes Sports Hall, Tallinn, Estonia
All times are Eastern European Time (UTC+02:00).

|}

|}

Pool C
Venue:  Polyvalent Hall, Bucharest, Romania
All times are Eastern European Time (UTC+02:00).

|}

|}

Pool D
Venue:  Centralny Osrodek Sportu, Szczyrk, Poland
All times are Central European Time (UTC+01:00).

|}

|}

Pool E
Venue:  Sportovní hala SSK, Tišnov, Czech Republic
All times are Central European Time (UTC+01:00).

|}

|}

Qualification phase 2

Pool G
Venue:  Ruma, Serbia

|}

|}

Pool H
Venue:  Anapa, Russia

|}

|}

References

External links

FIVB Volleyball Women's U20 World Championship
European Women's Junior qualification World Championship
2015 in youth sport